The German Green Party (Bündnis 90/Die Grünen) has been present in the German parliament (Bundestag) continuously since 29 March 1983 as a parliamentarian party.

10th Bundestag (1983–1987)
Scoring 5.6% in the federal parliamentary elections in 1983, the Greens entered the Bundestag for the first time with a total of 28 seats. Faction members were rotated after two years in 1985 (with the exception of Petra Kelly and Gert Bastian), but the concept was abolished in May 1986 again. The executive board, elected by faction members on 3 April 1984, consisted of Annemarie Borgmann, Waltraud Schoppe, Antje Vollmer, Christa Nickels, Heidemarie Dann and Erika Hickel.

The members of the faction were:

 Hendrik Auhagen (1985–1987)
 Sabine Bard (1983–1985)
 Gert Bastian (1983–1987, not a member of the faction from 1984 to 1986)
 Marieluise Beck (1983–1985)
 Dieter Burgmann (1983–1985)
 Annemarie Borgmann (1985–1987)
 Eberhard Bueb (1985–1987)
 Heidemarie Dann (1985–1987)
 Dieter Drabiniok (1983–1985)
 Wolfgang Ehmke (1983–1985)
 Uschi Eid (1985–1987)
 Joschka Fischer (1983–1985)
 Ulrich Fischer (1986–1987)
 Horst Fritsch (1986–1987)
 Gabriele Gottwald (1983–1985)
 Klaus Hecker (1983)
 Erika Hickel (1983–1985)
 Hannegret Hönes (1985–1987)
 Milan Horacek (1983–1985, successor of Klaus Hecker)
 Willi Hoss (1983–1985)
 Gert Jannsen (1983–1985)
 Petra Kelly (1983–1987)
 Hubert Kleinert (1983–1986)
 Julius Kriszan (1983–1985)
 Torsten Lange (1985–1987)
 Norbert Mann (1985–1987)
 Joachim Müller (1985–1987)
 Christa Nickels (1983–1985)
 Gabriele Potthast (1983–1985)
 Jürgen Reents (1983–1985)
 Christa Reetz (1983–1985)
 Herbert Rusche (1985–1987)
 Walter Sauermilch (1983–1985)
 Henning Schierholz (1985–1987)
 Otto Schily (1983–1986)
 Christian Schmidt (1985–1987)
 Dirk Schneider (1983–1985)
 Waltraud Schoppe (1983–1985)
 Walter Schwenninger (1983–1985)
 Stefan Schulte (1985–1987)
 Hans-Werner Senfft (1985–1987)
 Eckhard Stratmann (1983–1985)
 Hans-Christian Ströbele (1985–1987)
 Heinz Suhr (1985–1987)
 Willi Tatge (1986–1987)
 Udo Tischer (1985–1987, left the faction in 1986)
 Hans Verheyen (1983–1985)
 Axel Vogel (1985–1987)
 Roland Vogt (1983–1985)
 Antje Vollmer (1983–1985)
 Ludger Volmer (1985–1987)
 Marita Wagner (1985–1987)
 Gerd Werner (1985–1987)
 Helmut Werner (1985–1987)
 Karin Zeitler (1985–1987)

11th Bundestag (1987–1990)
In the 1987 parliamentary elections, the Green Party managed to increase its share of votes to 8.3%, gaining 44 parliament seats in the process. When the East German parliament, the Volkskammer, which was freely elected on 18 March 1990 for the first time, was disbanded in the process of the German reunification, another 7 seats were added as 7 members of the 21-member Volkskammer faction of the Green Party, elected by their peers, entered the Bundestag.

The members of the faction were:

 Marieluise Beck-Oberdorf
 Angelika Beer
 Helga Brahmst-Rock
 Hans-Joachim Brauer
 Ulrich Briefs (left the faction in 1990)
 Wolfgang Daniels
 Thomas Ebermann (1987–1989)
 Tay Eich (1989–1990)
 Uschi Eid
 Dora Flinner
 Sieglinde Friess (1989–1990)
 Charlotte Garbe
 Gerald Häfner
 Karitas Hensel
 Imma Hillerich
 Willi Hoss
 Uwe Hüser
 Petra Kelly
 Hubert Kleinert
 Wilhelm Knabe
 Almut Kottwitz (1989–1990)
 Matthias Kreuzeder
 Verena Krieger (1987–1989)
 Helmut Lippelt
 Alfred Mechtersheimer
 German Meneses-Vogl (1989–1990)
 Christa Nickels
 Jutta Oesterle-Schwerin
 Ellen Olms (1987–1989)
 Norbert Roske (1990)
 Bärbel Rust
 Hannelore Saibold
 Gertrud Schilling
 Otto Schily (left the faction in 1989 and became a member of the SPD faction)
 Marieluise Schmidt (1989–1990)
 Regula Schmidt-Bott (1987–1989)
 Waltraud Schoppe
 Peter Sellin (1987–1989)
 Eckhard Stratmann
 Manfred Such (1989–1990)
 Maria Luise Teubner
 Erika Trenz
 Trude Unruh (left the faction in 1989)
 Christa Vennegerts
 Antje Vollmer
 Ludger Volmer
 Michael Weiß
 Dietrich Wetzel
 Heike Wilms-Kegel
 Lieselotte Wollny
 Thomas Wüppesahl (left the faction on 26 January 1988)

12th Bundestag (1990–1994)
In 1990, elections were held separately in former East and West Germany; in West Germany, the Green Party did not manage to gain enough votes to enter parliament, only scoring 4.8% instead of the necessary 5%, but in East Germany, the Greens gained a 6.1% share of the votes and 8 seats in the Bundestag. While a green presence in the 12th Bundestag was thus secured, the Greens could not form a faction, instead remaining a "group" (with less rights and a smaller budget).

The members of the faction were:

 Klaus-Dieter Feige
 Ingrid Köppe
 Vera Lengsfeld
 Gerd Poppe
 Christina Schenk (left the faction in 1994)
 Werner Schulz
 Wolfgang Ullmann
 Konrad Weiß

13th Bundestag (1994–1998)
4 years later, in 1994, the Greens managed to recover from their losses again, achieving 7.3% and entering the parliament with 48 seats. Antje Vollmer, long-time member of the faction, was elected as first Green Vice President of the Bundestag with the help of the CDU faction.

The members of the faction included:

 Elisabeth Altmann
 Gila Altmann
 Marieluise Beck
 Volker Beck
 Angelika Beer
 Matthias Berninger
 Annelie Buntenbach
 Amke Dietert-Scheuer
 Franziska Eichstädt-Bohlig
 Uschi Eid
 Andrea Fischer
 Joschka Fischer
 Rita Grießhaber
 Gerald Häfner
 Antje Hermenau
 Kristin Heyne
 Ulrike Höfken
 Michaele Hustedt
 Manuel Kiper
 Monika Knoche
 Angelika Köster-Loßack
 Steffi Lemke
 Vera Lengsfeld (left the faction in 1996 and became a member of the CDU faction)
 Helmut Lippelt
 Oswald Metzger
 Kerstin Müller
 Winfried Nachtwei
 Christa Nickels
 Egbert Nitsch (1994–1996)
 Cem Özdemir
 Gerd Poppe
 Simone Probst
 Jürgen Rochlitz
 Hannelore Saibold
 Christine Scheel
 Irmingard Schewe-Gerigk
 Rezzo Schlauch
 Albert Schmidt
 Wolfgang Schmitt
 Ursula Schönberger
 Waltraud Schoppe
 Werner Schulz
 Rainder Steenblock (1996–1998)
 Marina Steindor
 Christian Sterzing
 Manfred Such
 Antje Vollmer
 Ludger Volmer
 Helmut Wilhelm
 Margareta Wolf

14th Bundestag (1998–2002)
In 1998, the Green Party suffered slight losses, dropping down to 6.7%, but still managed to gain 47 seats in a larger parliament. For the first time it was possible to form a red-green government coalition with the election-winning SPD.

The members of the faction were:

 Gila Altmann
 Marieluise Beck
 Volker Beck
 Angelika Beer
 Matthias Berninger
 Grietje Bettin (2000–2002)
 Annelie Buntenbach
 Ekin Deligöz
 Amke Dietert-Scheuer (2002)
 Thea Dückert
 Franziska Eichstädt-Bohlig
 Uschi Eid
 Hans-Josef Fell
 Andrea Fischer
 Joschka Fischer
 Katrin Göring-Eckardt
 Rita Grießhaber
 Gerald Häfner (2001–2002)
 Winfried Hermann
 Antje Hermenau
 Kristin Heyne
 Ulrike Höfken
 Michaele Hustedt
 Monika Knoche
 Angelika Köster-Loßack
 Steffi Lemke
 Helmut Lippelt
 Reinhard Loske
 Oswald Metzger
 Kerstin Müller
 Klaus Müller (1998–2000)
 Winfried Nachtwei
 Christa Nickels
 Cem Özdemir
 Simone Probst
 Claudia Roth (1998–2001)
 Christine Scheel
 Irmingard Schewe-Gerigk
 Rezzo Schlauch
 Albert Schmidt
 Werner Schulz
 Christian Simmert
 Christian Sterzing
 Hans-Christian Ströbele
 Jürgen Trittin
 Antje Vollmer
 Ludger Volmer
 Sylvia Voß
 Helmut Wilhelm
 Margareta Wolf

15th Bundestag (2002–2005)
While the ruling SPD suffered substantial losses during the 2002 parliamentary elections and only barely managed to become the biggest faction in the Bundestag, the Green Party gained 1.9 points compared to the 1998 elections, for a total of 8.6%, yielding 55 seats.

The members of the faction were:

 Kerstin Andreae
 Marieluise Beck
 Volker Beck
 Cornelia Behm
 Birgitt Bender
 Matthias Berninger
 Grietje Bettin
 Alexander Bonde
 Ekin Deligöz
 Thea Dückert
 Jutta Dümpe-Krüger
 Franziska Eichstädt-Bohlig
 Uschi Eid
 Hans-Josef Fell
 Joschka Fischer
 Katrin Göring-Eckardt
 Anja Hajduk
 Winfried Hermann
 Antje Hermenau
 Peter Hettlich
 Ulrike Höfken
 Thilo Hoppe
 Michaele Hustedt
 Renate Künast
 Fritz Kuhn
 Markus Kurth
 Undine Kurth
 Reinhard Loske
 Anna Lührmann
 Jerzy Montag
 Kerstin Müller
 Winfried Nachtwei
 Christa Nickels
 Friedrich Ostendorff
 Simone Probst
 Claudia Roth
 Krista Sager
 Christine Scheel
 Irmingard Schewe-Gerigk
 Rezzo Schlauch
 Albert Schmidt
 Werner Schulz
 Petra Selg
 Ursula Sowa
 Rainder Steenblock
 Silke Stokar
 Hans-Christian Ströbele
 Jürgen Trittin
 Marianne Tritz
 Hubert Ulrich
 Antje Vogel-Sperl
 Antje Vollmer
 Ludger Volmer
 Josef Winkler
 Margareta Wolf

16th Bundestag (2005–2009)
The ruling SPD/Green Party suffered losses during the 2005 parliamentary elections leading to a Grand Coalition between the SPD and the CDU/CSU. The Green Party lost four seats to go from 55 to 51 and went into opposition with the FDP and the Left Party.

The members of the faction were:

 Kerstin Andreae
 Marieluise Beck
 Cornelia Behm
 Birgitt Bender
 Alexander Bonde
 Ekin Deligöz
 Thea Dückert
 Uschi Eid
 Hans-Josef Fell
 Kai Gehring
 Katrin Göring-Eckardt
 Anja Hajduk
 Britta Haßelmann
 Winfried Hermann
 Peter Hettlich
 Priska Hinz
 Ulrike Höfken
 Bärbel Höhn
 Anton Hofreiter
 Thilo Hoppe
 Ute Koczy
 Sylvia Kotting-Uhl
 Renate Künast
 Fritz Kuhn
 Markus Kurth
 Undine Kurth
 Monika Lazar
 Reinhard Loske
 Anna Lührmann
 Nicole Maisch
 Jerzy Montag
 Kerstin Müller
 Winfried Nachtwei
 Omid Nouripour
 Brigitte Pothmer
 Claudia Roth
 Krista Sager
 Elisabeth Scharfenberg
 Christine Scheel
 Irmingard Schewe-Gerigk
 Gerhard Schick
 Grietje Staffelt
 Rainder Steenblock
 Silke Stokar von Neuforn
 Hans-Christian Ströbele
 Harald Terpe
 Jürgen Trittin
 Wolfgang Wieland
 Josef Philip Winkler
 Margareta Wolf

Alliance 90/The Greens